Lambda Tau Omega Sorority, Inc. is a multicultural sorority founded in 1988 at Montclair State College (now Montclair State University), by sixteen women who felt the need for a multicultural sorority at Montclair State College. Lambda Tau Omega is a founding member of the National Multicultural Greek Council (NMGC).

Purpose
According to the organization's website, Lambda Tau Omega's primary missions are "uplift womyn of all social structures while striving towards excellence through their ideals and accomplishments" and dedication to noble service with primary focus on the welfare of children.

Philanthropy
Lambda Tau Omega's main philanthropy is the welfare of children, but the sorority participates in many community service activities, including a Blue Ribbon Campaign, a Child Abuse Awareness campaign each April, and an AIDS Awareness campaign each December.

Chapters
 Genesis Alpha Chapter - Montclair State University
 Geminate Beta Chapter - William Paterson University
 Trilogy Gamma Chapter - New Jersey Institute of Technology
 Delta Quanyx Chapter - Kean University
 Quint Epsilon Chapter - Saint Peter's University
 Ever Zeta Chapter - Ramapo College
 Heptakin Eta Chapter - Seton Hall University
 Leonyne Theta Chapter - Rutgers University
 Feline Iota Chapter - New Jersey City University
 Krystallyne Kappa Chapter - The College of New Jersey
 Leviathan Lambda Chapter - University of Illinois at Urbana-Champaign
 Prysmatic Mu Chapter - Florida State University
 Nexthys Nu Chapter - Rider University
 Xpedieenth Xi Chapter - Fairleigh Dickinson University
 Vydurance Omicron Chapter - State University of New York at New Paltz
 Phonoxy Pi Chapter - Francis Marion University
 Nezwaly Rho Chapter - Temple University
 Ariamas Sigma Chapter - Stockton University
 Vierenti Upsilon Chapter - American International College
 Trinphoenite Phi Chapter - Rutgers University - Newark
Travinsus Chi Chapter - Rutgers University - Camden
 Nyris Psi Chapter - Rowan University
 Novalescent Alpha Alpha Chapter - Bloomfield College
 Tau - Philadelphia, Pennsylvania
 University of West Florida University of West Florida
 Caldwell University Caldwell University
 Stevens Institute of Technology Stevens Institute of Technology
 Trinity College Trinity College (Connecticut)

See also
 List of social fraternities and sororities
 National Multicultural Greek Council

References

External links
 Official website

National Multicultural Greek Council
Student societies in the United States
Student organizations established in 1988
Women's organizations based in the United States
1988 establishments in New Jersey